In classical mechanics, the Newton–Euler equations describe the combined translational and rotational dynamics of a rigid body.

Traditionally the Newton–Euler equations is the grouping together of Euler's two laws of motion for a rigid body into a single equation with 6 components, using column vectors and matrices. These laws relate the motion of the center of gravity of a rigid body with the sum of forces and torques (or synonymously moments) acting on the rigid body.

Center of mass frame

With respect to a coordinate frame whose origin coincides with the body's center of mass for τ(torque) and an inertial frame of reference for F(force), they can be expressed in matrix form as:

 

where

F = total force acting on the center of mass
m = mass of the body
I3 = the 3×3 identity matrix
acm = acceleration of the center of mass
vcm = velocity of the center of mass
τ = total torque acting about the center of mass
Icm = moment of inertia about the center of mass
ω = angular velocity of the body
α = angular acceleration of the body

Any reference frame

With respect to a coordinate frame located at point P that is fixed in the body and not coincident with the center of mass, the equations assume the more complex form:

 
where c is the location of the center of mass expressed in the body-fixed frame,
and

denote skew-symmetric cross product matrices.

The left hand side of the equation—which includes the sum of external forces, and the sum of external moments about P—describes a spatial wrench, see screw theory.

The inertial terms are contained in the spatial inertia matrix
 

while the fictitious forces are contained in the term:

When the center of mass is not coincident with the coordinate frame (that is, when c is nonzero), the translational and angular accelerations (a and α) are coupled, so that each is associated with force and torque components.

Applications

The Newton–Euler equations are used as the basis for more complicated "multi-body" formulations (screw theory) that describe the dynamics of systems of rigid bodies connected by joints and other constraints. Multi-body problems can be
solved by a variety of numerical algorithms.

See also
 Euler's laws of motion for a rigid body.
 Euler angles
 Inverse dynamics
 Centrifugal force
 Principal axes
 Spatial acceleration
 Screw theory of rigid body motion.

References

Rigid bodies
Equations